The 2006 Asian Badminton Championships was the 25th edition of the Asian Badminton Championships. It was held in Johor Bahru, Malaysia from March 28 to April 2, 2006 as a four-star tournament.

Medalists

Medal count

Final Results

Men's singles

Women's singles

Men's doubles

Women's doubles

Mixed doubles

References 
https://www.badmintoncentral.com/forums/index.php?threads/asian-badminton-championships-semi-final-01-04.31725/page-8

External links
 Draws and results – BadmintonAsia.org (.xls)
Luluk/Alvent Terjungkal, Nova/Lilyana ke Final Bulutangkis Asia 

Badminton Asia Championships
Asian Badminton Championships
B
2006 Asian Badminton Championships
2006 in Malaysian sport
Sport in Johor